Demidovo is a rural locality (a village) in Kurilovskoye Rural Settlement, Sobinsky District, Vladimir Oblast, Russia. The population was 104 as of 2010.

Geography 
Demidovo is located 6 km north of Sobinka (the district's administrative centre) by road. Lakinsky is the nearest rural locality.

References 

Rural localities in Sobinsky District